José Antonio Iglesias Alemán (born January 5, 1990) is a Cuban professional baseball shortstop in the Miami Marlins organization. He made his Major League Baseball (MLB) debut in 2011 with the Boston Red Sox, and has also played for the Detroit Tigers, Cincinnati Reds, Baltimore Orioles, Los Angeles Angels and Colorado Rockies.

Professional career

Defection and minors
While in Cuba, Iglesias played with La Habana of the Cuban National Series. With pitcher Noel Argüelles, Iglesias defected from the Cuban junior national team while in Canada in July 2008. Iglesias signed as an international amateur free agent with the Boston Red Sox in September 2009. Prior to the 2011 season, Iglesias was the sole Red Sox prospect on the MLB.com annual list of top 50 baseball prospects, where he was ranked 42nd.

Boston Red Sox (2011–2013)

In March 2011, Iglesias was optioned to the Triple-A Pawtucket Red Sox. Iglesias was called up by the Red Sox and made his major league debut on May 8, 2011 as a defensive substitute for Jed Lowrie in the ninth inning of a 9–5 win over the Minnesota Twins. In the next game, he represented the game-winning run, scoring from first base on a Carl Crawford double in the 11th inning. On May 11, 2011, Iglesias made his first MLB start due to Jed Lowrie being sick.

Iglesias started the 2012 season in Pawtucket. He was called up to Boston May 1 after an ailing back sidelined Kevin Youkilis, but he did not appear in a game before being sent back down to Triple-A. Iglesias also appeared late in the 2012 season to back up Mike Avilés, and hit his first career home run during this stretch.

Entering 2013, Iglesias was ranked as the 10th best prospect in the Red Sox organization, and 96th on the MLB.com Top 100 Prospects list. He started the season in Boston, going 9-for-20 with two doubles and one RBI in six games, but was optioned to Triple-A Pawtucket after Stephen Drew was activated on April 10. He was recalled by the Red Sox on May 24 when third baseman Will Middlebrooks was placed on the DL. Iglesias excelled while splitting time between shortstop and third base, remaining in the starting lineup even after Middlebrooks returned from the DL. Despite being known primarily for his defense, Iglesias batted .420 for a stretch of over 100 at-bats after being recalled, including an 18-game hitting streak that was broken on June 19 against the Tampa Bay Rays. For his efforts, he was named the American League Rookie of the Month for June. Iglesias started the 2013 season playing 63 games with a .330 batting average, a home run, and 19 RBIs while with Boston.

Detroit Tigers (2013–2018)
On July 30, Iglesias was traded to the Detroit Tigers in a three-team deal that sent Jake Peavy and Brayan Villarreal to the Boston Red Sox and Avisail García and Francellis Montas to the Chicago White Sox. Iglesias chose jersey No. 1, making him the first Tigers player to wear it since Lou Whitaker retired in 1995. Following the 50-game suspension given to Tigers' starting shortstop Jhonny Peralta on August 5 for his connections to the South Florida Biogenesis clinic, Iglesias was named the Tigers' new everyday shortstop.

For the rest of the 2013 season with the Tigers, Iglesias batted .259 with two home runs, and 10 RBIs in 46 games. Overall in 2013, Iglesias hit .303 with 3 home runs and 29 RBIs in 109 games combined with both the Red Sox and Tigers. On the field, he committed 6 errors in 357 chances. Iglesias was part of the Tigers' 25-man active roster for their postseason run. During the postseason, Iglesias batted .231 with one RBI. Iglesias finished second in the American League Rookie of the Year voting in 2013, being edged out by Wil Myers.

On January 8, 2014, Iglesias and the Tigers agreed to terms on a one-year contract worth $1.65 million.  Although Iglesias was under team control through 2018, his 2014 salary had yet to be determined after the contract he signed with the Red Sox as an amateur free agent expired. Iglesias missed the entire 2014 season due to stress fractures in both of his shins.

On July 6, 2015, Iglesias was named as a reserve for the  American League at the 2015 All-Star Game. On September 5, it was announced that Iglesias suffered a non-displaced small fracture in his right middle finger at the PIP joint after being hit on the hand by a pitch, and the team announced he would be out for at least two weeks. With the Tigers later falling out of the AL Central race, the team elected to not activate him from the DL for the remainder of the season. During the 2015 season, Iglesias posted a .300 batting average in 416 at-bats, with 17 doubles, two home runs and 23 RBIs.

On January 15, 2016, the Tigers avoided arbitration with Iglesias, agreeing on a one-year, $2.1 million contract. Iglesias made one trip to the disabled list in 2016, after suffering a left hamstring strain in August, but still reached career highs with 137 games, 467 at-bats and 26 doubles, and had the lowest strikeout percentage of all major league baseball players (9.7%), as he also had the highest contact percentage on his swings in the major leagues (91.2%). He finished the season with a .255 batting average, 4 home runs and 32 RBI. 

Following the season, Iglesias was named a Gold Glove Award finalist for shortstop, along with Francisco Lindor and Andrelton Simmons. With just five errors in 574 chances, he posted an AL-best .991 fielding percentage. His 11.6 ultimate zone rating (UZR) ranked third among AL shortstops.

On January 13, 2017, the Tigers avoided arbitration with Iglesias, agreeing on a one-year, $4.1 million contract. Iglesias batted .255 during the 2017 season. Despite appearing in just 130 games due to injuries, he set career highs in doubles (33), home runs (6) and RBI (54).

On January 17, 2018, the Tigers avoided arbitration with Iglesias, agreeing on a one-year, $6.275 million contract. Iglesias batted .269 during the 2018 season after appearing in 125 games, and stole a career-high 15 bases. He was transferred to the 60-day disabled list on September 14 with a lower abdominal strain, effectively ending his season.

Cincinnati Reds (2019)
On February 23, 2019, Iglesias signed a minor league deal with the Cincinnati Reds that included an invitation to spring training. The one-year contract included a guaranteed $2.5 million salary with up to $1 million in additional incentives. Expected to back up starting second baseman Scooter Gennett, Iglesias became a starter for the Reds when Gennett was injured late in spring training.

In 2019 he batted .288/.318/.407, while reaching career highs in home runs (11) and RBI (59). He made contact with the highest percentage of pitches he swung at outside the strike zone (82.6%) of all National Leaguers.

Baltimore Orioles (2020)
On January 7, 2020, Iglesias signed with the Baltimore Orioles on a one-year deal worth $3 million. The deal includes a club option for 2021 at an additional $3 million.

On July 24, 2020, Iglesias was the starting shortstop, making his Orioles debut on Opening Day against the Boston Red Sox. He slashed .373/.400/.556 with 17 doubles, three home runs and 24 RBI in 39 games despite lower-body injuries limiting him to 22 defensive starts in 2020.

Los Angeles Angels (2021) 
One month after the Orioles had exercised his $3.5 million club option on November 1, Iglesias was traded to the Los Angeles Angels for minor-league right-handed pitchers Garrett Stallings and Jean Pinto on December 2, 2020. Iglesias played in 114 games for the Angels, hitting .259 with eight home runs and 41 RBIs. On September 3, 2021, the Angels released Iglesias, clearing roster space for pitcher Janson Junk.

Boston Red Sox (2021)
On September 6, 2021, Iglesias was signed by the Boston Red Sox. He made his formal return to the team later that day when he entered as a defensive substitution for Taylor Motter in the top of the eighth inning. Through the end of the regular season, Iglesias appeared 23 games with Boston, including 14 starts at second base, while batting .356 with one home run and seven RBIs. While the Red Sox advanced to the 2021 postseason, Iglesias was ineligible, due to joining the organization after August 31. On October 6, Boston assigned him outright to Triple-A.

Colorado Rockies (2022)
On March 16, 2022, Iglesias signed a one-year contract with the Colorado Rockies. Iglesias appeared in 118 games for the Rockies, slashing .292/.328/.380 with 3 home runs and 47 RBI across 439 at-bats. He became a free agent following the season.

Miami Marlins (2023–present)
On March 9, 2023, Iglesias signed a minor league contract with the Miami Marlins organization.

Personal life
On June 25, 2018, Iglesias became a naturalized United States citizen. Iglesias and his wife have two sons and a daughter.

See also

 List of baseball players who defected from Cuba

References

External links

1990 births
Living people
American sportspeople of Cuban descent
American League All-Stars
Baltimore Orioles players
Boston Red Sox players
Cincinnati Reds players
Colorado Rockies players
Cuban emigrants to the United States
Defecting Cuban baseball players
Detroit Tigers players
Los Angeles Angels players
Lowell Spinners players
Major League Baseball players from Cuba
Cuban expatriate baseball players in the United States
Major League Baseball shortstops
Mesa Solar Sox players
Pawtucket Red Sox players
Peoria Javelinas players
Portland Sea Dogs players
Baseball players from Havana
Vaqueros de la Habana players
Naturalized citizens of the United States